What Just Happened??! with Fred Savage (or What Just Happened??!) is an American parody television series hosted by Fred Savage.  It is presented as the aftershow of a fictional drama series, The Flare.  The series is co-hosted by Taylor Tomlinson. It premiered on June 30, 2019 on Fox.

A press release in August 2019 by Fox's Entertainment President, Michael Thorn, stated that according to low ratings, a second season of the series was highly unlikely, rendering it as a de facto cancellation.

Episodes

References

External links

2010s American parody television series
2019 American television series debuts
2019 American television series endings
Aftershows
English-language television shows
Fox Broadcasting Company original programming
Television series about television
Television series by 20th Century Fox Television
Television series by Fox Entertainment